Separate Beds may refer to:

"Separate Beds", the third track on Squeeze's 1980 album, Argybargy
"Separate Beds", a song by New Found Glory appearing on the deluxe edition of their 2011 album, Radiosurgery